Aek Kanopan is a town or subdistrict in North Labuhan Batu Regency, North Sumatra province of Indonesia and it is the seat of North Labuhan Batu Regency.

Climate
Aek Kanopan has a tropical rainforest climate (Af) with heavy to very heavy rainfall year-round.

References

Populated places in North Sumatra
Regency seats of North Sumatra